Giorgio Piantella (Camposampiero, 6 July 1981) is an Italian pole vaulter.

Biography
He has 14 caps in national team from 2005 to 2012.

Achievements

National titles
Giorgio Piantella has won 15 times the individual national championship.
8 wins in the pole vault (2005, 2006, 2008, 2009, 2010, 2014, 2016, 2017)
7 wins in the pole vault indoor (2005, 2007, 2009, 2010, 2011, 2013, 2017)

References

External links
 

1981 births
Italian male pole vaulters
Living people
People from Camposampiero
Mediterranean Games bronze medalists for Italy
Athletes (track and field) at the 2013 Mediterranean Games
Universiade medalists in athletics (track and field)
Mediterranean Games medalists in athletics
Universiade silver medalists for Italy
Athletics competitors of Centro Sportivo Carabinieri
Medalists at the 2009 Summer Universiade
Sportspeople from the Province of Padua